Global communication or international communication is a branch of communication studies.

Global communication may also refer to:

 Global Communication, an electronic music act, composed of Tom Middleton and Mark Pritchard
 Global Communication Group, Inc., or Sky Link TV
"Global Communication", song on One Love (Glay album) (2001)
Glay Global Communication, TV series (2001)

See also
Study of global communication
Global Communications Conference
Global Communications Academy